Dylan Ragland, better known by his stage name Party Favor, is an American EDM DJ and producer.

Early life 
Ragland was born in Manhattan and grew up in Park City, Utah. He attended Chapman University. After graduating, he had worked for NBC making sizzle reels despite aspiring to become an actor. He quit the job shortly after to pursue a career in DJing. He began DJing with his friend, Alex, he met at Chapman before they separated. Later, he had used "Party Favor" as an alias to his musical project.

Career 
On April 22, 2016, he released "Bust Em" as a single along with a music video. On August 12, 2016, he released his debut extended play via Mad Decent titled "Party & Destroy" featuring collaborations with Sean Kingston, Rich The Kid, Gucci Mane, Dillon Francis and Gent & Jawns. In August 2016, Ragland collaborated with Dillon Francis to release "Shut It Down" as a single. A music video for the song was released.

In 2019, the 2018 single "Circle Up" (featuring singer Bipolar Sunshine) saw significant success due to its appearance in the Coca-Cola Energy launch commercial and on the eFootball Pro Evolution Soccer 2020 soundtrack.

Discography

Albums

Singles and EPs

Charted singles

References 

American DJs
American electronic musicians
People from Manhattan
Living people
Mad Decent artists
Electronic dance music DJs
Year of birth missing (living people)